Peter McNish McSkimming (1872–1941) was an Independent Member of Parliament for the Clutha electorate in the South Island of New Zealand.

Biography

Peter McSkimming was born on 9 March 1872 in Dreghorn, Ayrshire, Scotland, and emigrated from there with his parents Peter McSkimming and Catherine (née Pelling) in 1878. They initially settled in Lawrence before both Peters began work for John Nelson's clay pipe factory in Benhar, near Balclutha in 1881. McSkimming senior was a shrewd but humanitarian businessman, and bought the factory by the 1890s, turning it into a major manufacturer of ceramic sanitary products. The factory was renamed McSkimming Industries in 1917. When he died in 1923, his son took over the factory.

McSkimming represented the Clutha electorate in the New Zealand House of Representatives as an Independent from 1931 until his retirement in 1935. In 1935, he was awarded the King George V Silver Jubilee Medal.

McSkimming was chairman of the South Otago Freezing Co., Kaitangata Coal Co., Dominion Fertilizer Co., Bruce Woollen Co. and New Zealand Refrigerating Company

McSkimming married Agnes Jane Lowery in 1904, and they had five children. Three of their sons remained involved in the family business, running it until it was taken over by Ceramco in 1980. Notable among their offspring was Robert McSkimming (1916-1992), who was awarded a DFC for his work with the Royal New Zealand Air Force during World War II.

Notes

References

 The Rich List: Wealth and Enterprise in New Zealand 1820-2000 by Graeme Hunt (2000, Reed Books, Auckland)

1872 births
1941 deaths
Independent MPs of New Zealand
New Zealand Liberal Party MPs
New Zealand businesspeople
People from Otago
Members of the New Zealand House of Representatives
New Zealand MPs for South Island electorates
People from North Ayrshire
Scottish emigrants to New Zealand